WTLY (1270 AM) is a radio station in Tallahassee, Florida, licensed to and serving the Tallahassee area. The station is currently owned by iHeartMedia, Inc. Its studios are in the north side of Tallahassee, while the transmitter is located west of downtown.

History
For over a decade, the station's cornerstone program was The Jeff Cameron Show. On January 25, 2012, Cameron resigned his post and was later announced to have taken a job at WTSM-FM 97.9 ESPN Radio, also in Tallahassee.

On November 26, 2014, WNLS dropped its sports format and began stunting with Christmas music, branded as "Christmas 94.3". At midnight on December 26, WNLS flipped to AC as "94.3 My FM". The first song on MY FM was "St. Elmo's Fire (Man in Motion)" by John Parr

On September 24, 2015, WNLS rebranded as "94.5 My FM" (translator W232BO moved from 94.3 FM to 94.5 FM). On September 30, WNLS changed their call letters to WTLY.

On November 6, 2015, at 5 p.m., WTLY rebranded as "105.3 My FM" (translator changed frequency from 94.5 FM to 105.3 FM) and began stunting with Christmas music.

On May 27, 2017, WTLY flipped to urban contemporary as "105.3 The Beat", launching with 5,000 songs commercial free.

In June 2019, WTLY changed their format from urban contemporary (which moved to WGMY-HD2) to beach music, branded as "Beach 96.5" (simulcast on translator W243EG (96.5 FM)), utilizing iHeartMedia's Real Fun Beach Radio network. However, this turned out to be a stunt; on July 8, at 2 p.m., WTLY flipped to classic hip hop, branded as "Throwback 96.5". The first song on Throwback was "Whoomp! (There It Is)" by Tag Team.

On August 12, 2022 at midnight, after playing "Got Your Money" by Ol' Dirty Bastard featuring Kelis and going into a stopset, the station dropped the classic hip hop format and began stunting with Christmas music (with the first song under the stunt being Andy Williams' "It's the Most Wonderful Time of the Year"), teasing a new format to debut on the following Monday, the 15th. The station is also emphasizing it will remain the Tallahassee home of Florida State Seminoles athletics.

On August 15, 2022, after stunting with Christmas music, WTLY launched a sports format, branded as "96.5 The Spear".

Translators
WTLY programming is also carried on a broadcast translator to improve the coverage area of the main station in northeast portions of Tallahassee.

Previous logos

References

External links
FCC History Cards for WTLY
96.5 The Spear website

TLY
Radio stations established in 1946
IHeartMedia radio stations
1946 establishments in Florida
Sports radio stations in the United States